The Battle of the Fischa or Battle of the Leitha took place on 11 September 1146 near the Fischa River at the border of the Kingdom of Hungary and the March of Austria, which then belonged to the overlordship of the Dukes of Bavaria and it was ruled by margraves of the Franconian Babenberg dynasty.

The events 
The opponents were a Bavarian army led by duke Henry XI and the Hungarian army under the leadership of king Géza II and his uncle, the palatine Beloš Vukanović, who formerly served as regent and tutor for the underage king. The battle was a victory for the Hungarian army, which defeated a great army during an open battle.

References
 Kristó, Gyula: Háborúk és hadviselés az Árpádok korában. Szukits Könyvkiadó, Szeged, 2003. 
 Makk, Ferenc: Magyarország a 12. században. Gondolat, Budapest, 1986. 
 Magyarország hadtörténete két kötetben (ed.: Liptai, Ervin). Zrínyi Katonai Kiadó, Budapest, 1985. 
 Makk, Ferenc: "II. Géza". In: Kristó, Gyula – Makk, Ferenc: Az Árpádok – fejedelmek és királyok. Szukits Könyvkiadó, Szeged, 2003. )

1146 in Europe
Fischa
Fischa
Fischa
Fischa
the Fischa